The New Carlisle station is a closed railway station in New Carlisle, Quebec, Canada. It served the Montreal-Gaspé train until service was suspended east of Matapédia station in 2013 due to deteriorating track conditions.

Heritage Information
The station is a designated Heritage Railway Station, so protected since 1994. The station was built by the Canadian National Railways in 1947. The imposing, two-storey structure was built according to a 1920s plan "for Québec stations, in which the upper floor accommodates the administrative functions of a divisional point station, in addition to the station agent’s residence." The current station was built to replace a former building, destroyed by fire. 

On November 9, 1942, German spy Werner von Janowski came ashore from German submarine U-518 in Chaleur Bay, four miles to the west of town. He boarded a train in the New Carlisle station which the present one replaced. He intended to travel to Montreal, but was captured almost immediately after boarding.

References

External links

Via Rail stations in Quebec
Railway stations in Gaspésie–Îles-de-la-Madeleine
Disused railway stations in Canada
Railway stations closed in 2013